Area 38 may refer to:

 Brodmann area 38, an area of the brain
 Electric Area, a music satellite channel